Wally Yachts is a yacht brand headquartered in Tokyo.

Company history
Founded by Italian entrepreneur Luca Bassani in 1994, Wally started out with sailing boats and then branched out into designing motoryachts, including the 118 WallyPower.

Wally launched sailing yachts ranging from the Wallynano  day sailer to the  flybridge carbonfiber sloop Better Place.

Wally is known for being a pioneer of carbon fiber as a yacht-building material.

On 31 January 2019 Ferretti Group acquired Wally Yachts.

In film
In 2005, the 118 WallyPower featured in the film The Island, starring Ewan McGregor. The yacht appeared as a distant memory in the mind of McGregor's character. A 2004 Top Gear UK TV episode also featured the 118 WallyPower.

See also
 List of large sailing yachts
 List of sailboat designers and manufacturers

References

External links
 Official Wally website

Yacht design firms
Boat builders
Manufacturing companies of Monaco
Companies based in Monte Carlo
Companies established in 1994
Brands of Monaco
Germán Frers
Ferretti Group